11th ADG Awards
February 17, 2007

Contemporary Film: 
 Casino Royale 

Fantasy Film: 
 Pan's Labyrinth 

Period Film: 
 Curse of the Golden Flower 

The 11th Art Directors Guild Awards, given on 17 February 2007, honored the best art directors of 2006.

Winners and nominees

Film

Contemporary
 Casino Royale
Babel
The Da Vinci Code
The Departed
The Queen

Fantasy
 Pan's Labyrinth (El laberinto del fauno)
Ray Chan (art director), James Foster, Paul Inglis and Mike Stallion - Children of Men
Bruce Crone, William Hawkins and William Ladd Skinner- Pirates of the Caribbean: Dead Man's Chest
Superman Returns
V for Vendetta

Period
 Curse of the Golden Flower (Man cheng jin dai huang jin jia)
Chris Burian-Mohr – Dreamgirls
Jack G. Taylor – Flags of Our Fathers
Robert Guerra and Miguel Lopez Castillo – The Good Shepherd
Kevin Kavanaugh – The Prestige

Television
Single Camera Series:
Joseph Bennett – Rome for Episode 1
Multiple Camera Series:
John Sabato – Mad TV for Episode 1106
Television Movie or Miniseries:
Stuart Wurtzel – Empire Falls
Awards Show, Variety or Music Special, or Documentary:
Roy Christopher – 77th Academy Awards
Commercial, Promo or PSA:
Jeremy Reed – Bud Light

References

External links
 The winners and nominees on the official website

Art Directors Guild Awards
2006 film awards
2006 guild awards
2007 in American cinema